The Julfa Mata Temple is a Hindu temple in the town of Nangal, Rupnagar district, Punjab, in northern India.

According to the story, there were demons who harassed gods over the Himalayan Mountains. The gods decided to destroy them. Lord Vishnu was leading them. The Gods focused their strengths in a huge flame which rose from the earth. Out of the fire a girl took birth and regarded as Adishakti (means first shakti). She grew up in the house of Prajapati Daksha. She used to be called as Sati. Later she became wife of Lord Shiva.

Once, Prajapati Daksha insulted Lord Shiva. Sati was unable to accept this and she killed herself. When Lord Shiva learned of his wife's death, there were no boundaries of his extreme anger. He began stalking the three worlds while holding Sati's body. The other Gods approached Lord Vishnu for help as they were afraid of Lord Shiva's rage. Lord Vishnu using his Chakra which severed Sati’s body into fifty-one pieces. Wherever the pieces fell, the fifty-one sacred Shaktipeeths came into existence. It is believed that at Julfa Mata temple, Sati's hair fell. The word 'julfa' means hair.

Many devotees visit the temple. The temple is on the hills by the Nangal – Hambewal road. The temple is around five kilometers away from the Nangal township. In early days people walked to the temple, but now there is a road.

Near the entrance of the temple, on the right hand side, there is a Shiva temple. There is a Peepal (Bo or Sacred Ficus) tree and devotees tie threads to that. The thread is known as moli. There is a belief that deity fulfills all the wishes of devotees. Inside temple there is idol of Mata. There is a priest who takes care of temple. Devotees usually bring offerings for the Devi. The offerings includes sweets (Suji halwa, laddu, barfi), kheel (sugar-coated puffed rice), narial (coconut) and flowers. In navarats and saavan days, the temple gets decorated with lights, etc.

External links 
 Facebook page of Temple

References

Hindu temples in Punjab, India
Rupnagar